Christoph Genz (born 1 March 1971 in Erfurt) is a German tenor in opera and concert.

Career 
Christoph Genz was a member of the Thomanerchor. He studied music at King's College, Cambridge, where he was a member of the King's College Choir. He studied voice with Hans-Joachim Beyer at the Hochschule für Musik und Theater "Felix Mendelssohn Bartholdy" Leipzig and with Elisabeth Schwarzkopf. In 1996, he won the first prize of the International Johann Sebastian Bach Competition.

In 1997, he became a member of the Theater Basel. He appeared as a guest at theatres such as the Teatro alla Scala, the Semperoper, Théâtre des Champs-Élysées, Paris and the opera houses of Lausanne, Cologne, Nancy, Leipzig, Wiesbaden, La Coruna and others. In 2000, Genz sang for the first time at the Hamburg State Opera. From 2001 to 2004 he was a member, singing parts such as Tamino in Mozart's Die Zauberflöte, Belmonte in Die Entführung aus dem Serail, 'Ferrando' in Cosi fan tutte, 'Don Ottavio' in Don Giovanni, Chevalier in Poulenc's Dialogues des Carmélites and many more.

Genz has appeared under leading conductors such as Herbert Blomstedt, Giuseppe Sinopoli, Riccardo Chailly, Kurt Masur, Sir Simon Rattle, Nicolaus Harnoncourt, Sir John Eliot Gardiner, Sir Roger Norrington, Ton Koopman, Ingo Metzmacher, Kent Nagano, Ivor Bolton, Markus Stenz, Daniel Harding, Helmuth Rilling, Michail Jurowski, Masaaki Suzuki and others.

His discography contains more than 60 CDs and DVDs including operas, concerts, songs and arias. He recorded Bach cantatas with Sir John Eliot Gardiner and sang the tenor roles in La Petite Bande's Complete Bach Cantatas conducted by Sigiswald Kuijken recorded between 2006 and 2011, as well as the St John Passion conducted by Ludwig Güttler, the St Matthew Passion and the Mass in B minor with La Petite Bande conducted by Sigiswald Kuijken. In 2005, he appeared with La Petite Bande in a concert of Bach cantatas at the Rheingau Musik Festival in the Eibingen Abbey, together with Siri Thornhill, Petra Noskaiová and Jan van der Crabben. He performed in Mendelssohn's Lobgesang, conducted by Helmuth Rilling. He sang the part of Brighella in a recording of Ariadne auf Naxos of Richard Strauss, with the Staatskapelle Dresden and Giuseppe Sinopoli and the part of Tamino in a recording with Sigiswald Kuijken. He performed the Mass in B minor also with the Gewandhausorchester Leipzig, conducted by both Herbert Blomstedt and Georg Christoph Biller.

From 2017 - 2022 Genz was working as Head of Arts Department, Music teacher and Dean of Faculty at UWC Changshu in China, which is part of the group of United World Colleges. He is currently working as Director of Performing Arts at United World College of the Adriatic in Duino, Italy, where he is also teaching Music.

References

External links 
 
 Entries for recordings by Christoph Genz on WorldCat

German operatic tenors
1971 births
Living people
Musicians from Erfurt
21st-century German male opera singers